D522 is a state road in the Lika region of Croatia that connects the A1 motorway's Gornja Ploča interchange to the D1 state road, facilitating access from A1 motorway to Plitvice Lakes National Park. The road is 13.2 km long.

The D522 is a brza cesta (expressway), a limited-access road with an increased speed limit.

The road, as well as all other state roads in Croatia, is managed and maintained by Hrvatske ceste, state owned company.

Traffic volume 

Traffic is regularly counted and reported by Hrvatske ceste, operator of the road. Substantial variations between annual (AADT) and summer (ASDT) traffic volumes are attributed to the fact that the road serves as A1 motorway connector, carrying substantial tourist traffic especially to Plitvice Lakes National Park.

Road junctions

See also
 Plitvice Lakes National Park

Sources

State roads in Croatia
Expressways in Croatia
Lika-Senj County